Angelika Tazreiter (born 18 July 1987) is an Austrian racing cyclist. She rode in the women's road race event at the 2018 UCI Road World Championships.

Major results
2018
 3rd Road race, National Road Championships
2019
 2nd Road race, National Road Championships

References

1987 births
Living people
Austrian female cyclists
Place of birth missing (living people)
21st-century Austrian women